Laura Strugnell (born 14 April 1992) is a South African synchronized swimmer. She competed in the 2020 Summer Olympics in Tokyo, Japan. She also competed at the 2022 World Aquatics Championships in Budapest, Hungary.

References

1992 births
Living people
South African synchronised swimmers
Synchronized swimmers at the 2020 Summer Olympics
Olympic synchronised swimmers of South Africa
Artistic swimmers at the 2022 World Aquatics Championships